GME may refer to:

Companies
 GameStop (stock ticker symbol GME), an American video game retailer
 GameStop short squeeze, an event when this company's stock price rapidly increased
 General Microelectronics, a defunct American semiconductor manufacturer
 General Motors Egypt
 General Motors Europe
 Green Mountain Energy, American company
 Guardian Media Entertainment

Education
 Gaelic medium education in Scotland
 Graduate medical education

Other
 East Germanic languages
 GME of Deutscher Wetterdienst, weather prediction model of the German Weather Service
 Generic Modeling Environment
 Granulomatous meningoencephalitis, disease of the central nervous system of dogs and, rarely, cats
Greater Middle East, a region